Kushok Bakula Rimpochee Airport  is a domestic airport serving Leh, the capital of Ladakh, India. The airport is named after 19th Kushok Bakula Rinpoche, an Indian statesman and monk, whose Spituk Monastery is in direct vicinity to the airfield.

Military use 

Due to the presence of mountain winds in the afternoon, all flights take off and land in the morning. The approach is challenging as it is unidirectional and has high terrain towards the eastern end of the airport. Airport security is highly restricted with Indian Army patrols. Due to its location in between the Himalayas, the approach to Leh Airport has been named as one of the world's most scenic approaches.

Civilian use

Civil aviation enclave

In February 2016, it was reported that the Indian Air Force had handed the airport to Airports Authority of India, which planned to expand it for civilian purposes. However, the reports of IAF vacating the entire air base were dismissed by Ministry of Defence and Deputy Commissioner of Leh. They clarified that the IAF would vacate only a small part of land for construction of a new terminal.

Construction of a new terminal has been completed. The new multi-level terminal is expected to span across approximately 19,000 square metres along with fixed link bridges and a utility building of around 3,340 square metres.

New terminal

Due to increasing traffic, the Airports Authority of India is constructing a new state-of-the-art passenger terminal just beside the current terminal, at a cost of ₹ 480 crores. It will be equipped with all modern and essential passenger-friendly facilities and amenities. It will have a 4-star rating for Integrated Habitat Assessment (GRIHA) rated energy-efficient terminal building, and will have 18 check-in counters, in-line baggage handing system and centralized cooling and heating systems for providing comfort to the passengers, specially during extreme winter times. It will be capable of serving 2 million passengers per annum.

Construction of the new terminal began in February 2019, and was expected to be completed by December 2022. Due to some delays, it is now expected to be completed by mid-2023.

Airlines and destinations

Passenger

Cargo

Statistics

References

External links 
 Kushok Bakula Rimpochee Airport at Airports Authority of India website
 IAF's ALG

Transport in Leh
Airports in Ladakh
Airports with year of establishment missing